Marie Étienne is a French poet and novelist. In 2009, her book Roi des cent cavaliers (published in France in 2002) and now translated into English as King of a Hundred Horseman won the PEN Award for Poetry in Translation. Étienne is the author of eleven books of poems and nine books of prose, which her translator Marilyn Hacker says "could be variously classed as fiction, memoir, and cultural history, some partaking of all three".

From 1979 to 1988, Marie Étienne worked as assistant to the innovative French theater director Antoine Vitez, whose courses on the theater she had followed as part of her doctoral thesis research, at the Théâtre d’Ivry and the Théâtre national de Chaillot. Her work with Vitez, including transcriptions of her notebooks of the era, resulted in Antoine Vitez: Ie roman du théâtre (2000), a book Hacker describes as "in a genre Americans would call literary memoir published a decade after the director’s death and almost twenty years after their collaboration. It offers an invaluable aperçu of a collaborative artistic endeavor and a signal era in contemporary French theater".

Awards
 1997 Mallarmé prize
 2009 PEN Award for Poetry in Translation

Works
"Ocean / Emotion", Poetry Daily
 Blancs Clos 1977
 Le Point d'Aveugement 1978

Translations

Anthologies

Valentina Gosetti, Andrea Bedeschi, Adriano Marchetti, eds. (2017). Donne. Poeti di Francia e Oltre. Dal Romanticismo a Oggi. Giuliano Ladolfi Editore. .

Reviews
Originally published in French in 2002, Marie Étienne’s King of a Hundred Horsemen, translated by Marilyn Hacker, occupies an odd position somewhere between poetry and prose, observation and memory, dramatic enunciation and factual report. Although the opening sequence evokes the Parisian poet’s upbringing in French Indochina, the book is constructed around a deliberate lack of any anchoring subjectivity....

Marilyn Hacker’s translation of Marie Étienne’s eleventh book of poems, King of a Hundred Horsemen, represents an ample first introduction to the work of this restlessly inventive French literary figure.

References

External links
"A bilingual reading", the Red Wheelbarrow Bookstore, 22 juin 2009

Marilyn Hacker's 'Translator's Preface' to King of a Hundred Horseman

1938 births
Living people
People from Menton
20th-century French poets
20th-century French novelists
21st-century French novelists
French women poets
French women novelists
21st-century French women writers
20th-century French women writers